Nine referendums were held in Switzerland in 1975. The first was held on 2 March on an amendment to the Swiss Federal Constitution on the article on the economic cycle. Although it was approved by a majority of voters, it did not receive the support of a majority of cantons (the result was an 11–11 tie), so was rejected. The next five were held on 8 June on protecting currency (approved), financing the national road network (approved), amending the general tariff (rejected), increasing taxes the following year (approved) and restricting federal expenditure (approved). The final three were held on 7 December on a constitutional amendment on the right to residence and welfare benefits (approved), a constitutional amendment on water management (approved) and a federal law on the import and export of agricultural goods (approved).

Results

March: Economic cycle

June: Currency protection

June: National road network

June: General tariff

June: Increasing taxes

June: Spending restrictions

December: Constitutional amendment on residence and welfare benefits

December: Constitutional amendment on water management

December: Federal law on the import and export of agricultural goods

References

1975 referendums
1975 in Switzerland
Referendums in Switzerland